The men's 100 metre breaststroke event at the 2004 Summer Olympics was contested at the Olympic Aquatic Centre of the Athens Olympic Sports Complex in Athens, Greece on August 14 and 15.

After finishing fourth in Sydney (2000), Japan's Kosuke Kitajima edged out U.S. swimmer and world-record holder Brendan Hansen to claim the gold medal by 0.17 of a second, in a time of 1:00.08. Katajima used an illegal dolphin kick during a pull-out, however he was not disqualified, and the rules were changed less than a year later to allow for a single dolphin kick after the start and after each wall. Hansen, who turned 23 on the final day, earned a silver in 1:00.25, while France's Hugues Duboscq held off onrushing American Mark Gangloff to take the bronze in 1:00.88.

Earlier in the semifinals Hansen lowered an Olympic record to 1:00.01 that had been set by his archrival Kitajima in the preliminaries by just 0.02 of a second.

Russia's Roman Sloudnov, the third-fastest man in Olympic history and the first to swim under one minute, missed the top 8 final by 0.18 seconds (1:01.54).

Records
Prior to this competition the existing world and Olympic records were as follows.

The following new world and Olympic records were set during this competition.

Results

Heats

Semifinals

Semifinal 1

Semifinal 2

Final

References

External links
Official Olympic Report

M
Men's events at the 2004 Summer Olympics